The 2019-20 Fordham Rams women's basketball team represents Fordham University during the 2019-20 NCAA Division I women's basketball season. The Rams are led by ninth-year head coach Stephanie Gaitley. They were members of the Atlantic 10 Conference and play their home games at the Rose Hill Gymnasium. They finished the season 21-11, 11-5 in A-10 play. Fordham lost the Atlantic 10 Conference tournament championship game over VCU, 55–60.

Schedule

|-
!colspan=9 style=| Exhibition

|-
!colspan=9 style=| Non-conference regular season

|-
!colspan=9 style=| Atlantic 10 regular season

|-
!colspan=9 style=| Atlantic 10 Women's Tournament

|- style="text-align:center;"
! AP 
| style="background:#FFF;" | 
| style="background:#FFF;" | 
| style="background:#FFF;" | 
| style="background:#FFF;" | 
| style="background:#FFF;" | 
| style="background:#FFF;" | 
| style="background:#FFF;" | 
| style="background:#FFF;" | 
| style="background:#FFF;" | 
| style="background:#FFF;" | 
| style="background:#FFF;" | 
| style="background:#FFF;" | 
| style="background:#FFF;" | 
| style="background:#FFF;" | 
| style="background:#FFF;" | 
| style="background:#FFF;" | 
| style="background:#FFF;" | 
| style="background:#FFF;" | 
| style="background:#FFF;" | 
| style="background:#FFF;" | N/A
|- style="text-align:center;"
! Coaches 
| style="background:#FFF;" | 
| style="background:#FFF;" | 
| style="background:#FFF;" | 
| style="background:#FFF;" | 
| style="background:#FFF;" | 
| style="background:#FFF;" | 
| style="background:#FFF;" | 
| style="background:#FFF;" | 
| style="background:#FFF;" | 
| style="background:#FFF;" | 
| style="background:#FFF;" | 
| style="background:#FFF;" | 
| style="background:#FFF;" | 
| style="background:#FFF;" | 
| style="background:#FFF;" | 
| style="background:#FFF;" | 
| style="background:#FFF;" | 
| style="background:#FFF;" | 
| style="background:#FFF;" | 
| style="background:#FFF;" | 
|}

See also
 2019–20 Fordham Rams men's basketball team

References

Fordham
Fordham Rams women's basketball seasons
Fordham